Charles Emmanuel de Savoie, 3rd Duc de Nemours (7 February 1567 15 August 1595), was known as the prince of Genevois during his childhood. He was the Duke of Nemours from 1585 to his death in 1595, during the French Wars of Religion.

Life

Charles Emmanuel was the son of Jacques of Savoy and Anne of Este, the widow of Francis, Duke of Guise. He was duke at a volatile time, and subsequently was involved in many political intrigues, mostly by his relationship on his mother's side with the House of Guise. The Duke of Guise was one of the leaders of the Catholic League opposing the Huguenots, and Charles Emmanuel sympathised with their cause. However, after the assassination of Henry I, Duke of Guise and his brother the Cardinal of Guise, Charles Emmanuel was imprisoned by the Huguenots in 1588, but was able to escape.

Charles Emmanuel fought against the Huguenot forces for some years; he fought at the Battle of Arques in 1589. That same year, he was the governor of Paris, as the Huguenot forces, led by Henry of Navarre besieged Paris. During the siege, King Henry III of France perished, and Henry of Navarre soon declared himself King Henry IV of France. Charles Emmanuel escaped, and fought the newly proclaimed King at the Ivry in 1590, which was a decisive loss for the Catholic League. The same year he commanded Catholic forces, of nearly 50,000 men, during the Siege of Paris. During the siege, Charles Emmanuel, along with other nobles swore to keep Paris for the Catholic faith and preferring death to swearing allegiance to the king of Navarre, as the Catholic League called him.

After the defeat, Charles Emmanuel strongly disagreed with his half-brother and long-time ally Charles of Lorraine, Duke of Mayenne (also of the House of Guise), who advocated conciliation with Henry IV. Charles Emmanuel withdrew to his government in Lyonnais, where he endeavoured to make himself independent from the French crown. He was imprisoned, however, in the chateau of Pierre-Encise by the archbishop of Lyon. Again, he successfully escaped, and decided to attack Lyon. The intervention of the Constable de Montmorency thwarted his attack however, and his attempt at independence failed.

Charles Emmanuel died at Annecy on 15 August 1595, leaving the Duchy of Nemour to his brother Henri de Savoie.

See also
Duke of Nemours
House of Guise
French Wars of Religion
Catholic League (French)

References

Sources

1567 births
1595 deaths
Counts of Geneva
Savoie, Charles Emmanuel de
Savoie, Charles Emmanuel de
Princes of Savoy
Military governors of Paris